Jean Balissat (May 15, 1936 – September 16, 2007) was a composer, a professor of music and the conductor of various Swiss orchestras.

Biography
Jean Balissat was born in Lausanne, Switzerland. He studied counterpoint and harmony with Hans Haug in Lausanne. In 1954, he moved to Geneva, where he studied the orchestration of Andre-Francois Marescotti and course management with Samuel Baud-Bovy. He also studied percussion with Charles Peschier and the horn with Robert Faller.

From 1972 to 1983, he was professor of composition and orchestration at the University of Geneva. Since 1979, he also served as a professor at the University of Lausanne.  Moreover, he was from 1960 to 1983 in the conductor of various brass orchestras, including 12 years at the helm of La Landwehr in Fribourg.

Balissat died in September 2007 in Corcelles-le-Jorat, Switzerland.

Works
 Adagio et fugue (1956) pour violon et piano
 Sept variations pour octuor (1971) 
 Fête des vignerons (1977) sur un livret d'Henri Debluë 
 Rückblick (1980) pour violon et orchestre 
 Incantation et sacrifice (1981) essai pour une harmonie bicéphale 
 Bioméros (1982) pour orchestre de chambre 
 Le Chant de l'Alpe (1994) pour orchestre à vents
 Gli Elementi (1998) pour orchestre d'harmonie 
 Le premier jour pour orchestre d'harmonie 
 Les Gursks pour orchestre d'harmonie
 Petite ouverture romantique pour orchestre à vents
 Preludio Alfetto pour orchestre à vents
 Second Sinfonietta For Band pour orchestre de cuivres 
 Sinfonie pour orchestre d'harmonie 
 Songes d'automne pour orchestre d'harmonie 
 Statterostrob pour piano seul
Variations concertantes pour trois percussionnistes et orchestre

External links
 Jean Balissat

1936 births
2007 deaths
Concert band composers
Swiss conductors (music)
Male conductors (music)
People from Lausanne
20th-century conductors (music)
20th-century male musicians